Warley Nascimento de Oliveira (born 26 September 1989) is a Brazilian footballer who currently plays as a forward for the  Vietnamese V.League 1 side, Quảng Nam.

References

1989 births
Brazilian footballers
Living people
Quang Nam FC players
Association football forwards